Russkoye Ilchikeyevo (Urıś İlsekäye) is a rural locality (a village) in Meshchegarovsky Selsoviet, Salavatsky District, Bashkortostan, Russia. The population was 108 as of 2010. There are 2 streets.

Geography 
Russkoye Ilchikeyevo is located 36 km southeast of Maloyaz (the district's administrative centre) by road. Bash-Ilchikeyevo is the nearest rural locality.

References 

Rural localities in Salavatsky District